The taiga bean goose (Anser fabalis) is a goose that breeds in northern Europe and Asia. This and the tundra bean goose are recognised as separate species by the American Ornithological Society and the International Ornithologists' Union, but are considered a single species by other authorities (collectively called bean goose). It is migratory and winters further south in Europe and Asia. The taiga and tundra bean goose diverged about 2.5 million years ago and established secondary contact ca. 60,000 years ago, resulting in extensive gene flow.

Description 
In the nominate subspecies, males average  and females average . The bill is black at the base and tip, with an orange band across the middle; the legs and feet are also bright orange.

The upper wing-coverts are dark brown, as in the white-fronted goose (Anser albifrons) and the lesser white-fronted goose (A. erythropus), but differing from these in having narrow white fringes to the feathers.

The voice is a loud honking, higher pitched in the smaller subspecies.

The closely related pink-footed goose (A. brachyrhynchus) has the bill short, bright pink in the middle, and the feet also pink, the upper wing-coverts being nearly of the same bluish-grey as in the greylag goose. In size and bill structure, it is very similar to Anser fabalis rossicus, and in the past was often treated as a sixth subspecies of bean goose.

Taxonomy 
The English and scientific names of the bean goose come from its habit in the past of grazing in bean field stubbles in winter. Anser is the Latin for "goose", and fabalis is derived from the Latin 
faba, a broad bean.

There are three subspecies, with complex variation in body size and bill size and pattern; generally, size increases from north to south and from west to east. 
Taiga bean goose (Anser fabalis sensu stricto) (Latham, 1787)
 A. f. fabalis (Latham, 1787). Scandinavia east to the Urals. Large; bill long and narrow, with broad orange band. Anser fabalis fabalis is one of the species to which the Agreement on the Conservation of African-Eurasian Migratory Waterbirds (AEWA) applies.
 A. f. johanseni (Delacour, 1951). West Siberian taiga. Large; bill long and narrow, with narrow orange band.
 A. f. middendorffii (Severtzov, 1873). East Siberian taiga. Very large; bill long and stout, with narrow orange band.

Distribution 

The taiga bean goose is a rare winter visitor to Britain. There are two regular wintering flocks of taiga bean goose, in the Yare Valley, Norfolk and the Avon Valley, Scotland. A formerly regular flock in Dumfries and Galloway no longer occurs there.

The taiga bean geese Anser fabalis fabalis wintering in Europe are considered to migrate across three different flyways: Western, Central and Eastern; which has been confirmed by stable isotope analysis of their flight feathers.

The population of the Taiga Bean Geese has decreased by roughly 50% since the 1990s and is still declining. From the mid-1990s to 2009 alone, population size fell from an estimated 100,000 to 60,000. The cause of this population decline is due to hunting, primarily in Sweden & Denmark, with inadequate regulation regarding the protection of the Taiga Bean Geese.

References

Further reading

External links

 RSPB Birds by Name – Bean Goose
 BirdGuides Bean Goose Page
 Cyberbirding: Bean Goose pictures
 
 
 
 

taiga bean goose
Birds of Scandinavia
Birds of Russia
taiga bean goose
taiga bean goose